Peperomia clusiifolia is a species of plant in the genus Peperomia. It is endemic to Jamaica. It is commonly known as red edge peperomia because its leaf margins are tinged with dark red. There are varieties where this red or lighter colors are shown as striking variegation. These are typically sold under names such as P. clusiifolia 'Variegata', P. 'Jellie', or P. 'Tricolor'.

References

clusiifolia
Flora of Jamaica
Taxa named by William Jackson Hooker
Plants described in 1829
Flora without expected TNC conservation status